Johann Andreas Buchner (6 April 1783, Munich – 5 June 1852, Munich) was a German pharmacologist working in the area of alkaloids. He was the father of pharmacologist Ludwig Andreas Buchner (1813–1897).

He studied at Johann Bartholomäus Trommsdorff's pharmaceutical institute in Erfurt, obtaining his PhD in 1807. In 1809 he became Oberapotheker of the Zentral-Stiftungs-Apotheke for hospitals in Munich. In 1818 he was appointed an associate professor of pharmacy, medical formula instruction and toxicology at the University of Landshut, where he later became a full professor of pharmacy (1822). When the university relocated to Munich, he moved back to his home town, where he lived and worked until his death.

He is credited with isolating salicin from willow bark (1828) and the discovery of berberine (from the root bark of Berberis vulgaris).

Works
Vollständiger Inbegriff der Pharmacie in ihren Grundlehren und praktischen Theilen : ein Handbuch für Aerzte und Apotheker . Bände: 2 / Bd.1 T.3 / Bd.2 T.4 / Bd.3 T.4 / 7 . Schrag, Nürnberg 1822 - 1828 Digital edition by the University and State Library Düsseldorf

Notes

References

German pharmacologists
1783 births
1852 deaths
Academic staff of the Ludwig Maximilian University of Munich
Scientists from Munich
19th-century chemists
19th-century German scientists